Amolops himalayanus (Himalaya sucker frog, Himalaya cascade frog, or Himalaya frog) is a species of frog found in northeastern India and Nepal.

Whether this species is distinct from Amolops formosus is still debated. For example, the most recent IUCN assessment (2004) treated Amolops himalayanus as a synonym of Amolops formosus.

References

himalayanus
Amphibians of Nepal
Frogs of India
Amphibians described in 1888